Helen Ma (birth name Hui) is a Chinese figure skating coach in Australia. She graduated from Harbin Sports University. She and her husband Andrew Wang moved to Australia in 1996. She previously coached the Chinese national team. They are the parents of Tina Wang.

Her current and former students include Portia Rigby & Francis Rigby, Yang Fang & Gao Chongbo, Zhang Weina & Cao Xianming,  Joel Watson,  Tina Wang, and 
Kristie Kettleton & Trevor Sieders.

References

External links
 Coaching profile

Chinese female single skaters
Chinese figure skating coaches
Year of birth missing (living people)
Living people
Female sports coaches